By Your Side is the debut album by French DJ and producer Breakbot that includes the singles "Baby I'm Yours," "One Out of Two" and "Fantasy."

The album charted at #19 in France and #160 in Belgium (Wallonia).

Track listing

Charts

In popular culture

References

External links

2012 debut albums
Breakbot albums
Ed Banger Records albums